Dust Waltz is an original graphic novel based on the Buffy the Vampire Slayer television series. The first ever Buffyverse comic.  It appeared only as a graphic novel, rather than in comic format.

Story description

Two mysterious sisters, Lilith and Lamia, arrive in Sunnydale and bring along some nasty beasts. Buffy tries to find out who or what they are. This plan is complicated when one of the sisters takes a liking to Angel. The sisters turn out to be ancient vampires; each hopes to bring a champion to town to fight to death in a magical ritual called the Dust Waltz.  The Waltz involves ritual murder, blood drinking, an opened Hellmouth, and apocalypse. Meanwhile, the Scooby Gang shows Giles's niece the town.

Comics based on Buffy the Vampire Slayer